William Thomas Kirschbaum (November 5, 1902 – April 29, 1953) was an American competition swimmer and Olympic medalist.  At the 1924 Summer Olympics in Paris, he received the bronze medal for his third-place performance in the men's 200-meter breaststroke event, finishing in a time of 3:01.0.

See also
 List of Olympic medalists in swimming (men)

References

External links
 

1902 births
1953 deaths
American male breaststroke swimmers
Olympic bronze medalists for the United States in swimming
Swimmers at the 1924 Summer Olympics
Medalists at the 1924 Summer Olympics
20th-century American people